The semblative case is a grammatical case that denotes the similarity of one entity to another.

In Wagiman
Wagiman, an indigenous Australian language, has a semblative case suffix -yiga, that is functionally identical to the -like suffix in English, as in the example:

In English
English has a number of semblative derivational suffixes, including -like and -esque. 
Texas Man Catches Fish With Human-Like Teeth 

However, as in many other languages, semblativity in English is marked with derivational affixes instead of being an inflectional case.

See also
 Comparative case
 Formal case
 Equative case

References

Grammatical cases